Anne Pitoniak (March 30, 1922 – April 22, 2007) was an American actress. She was nominated twice for Broadway's Tony Award as Best Actress (Play) in 1983 for 'night, Mother and as Best Actress (Featured Role – Play) in 1994 for a revival of William Inge's Picnic. She is best known for her roles in The Survivors (1983), Housekeeping (1987), Hiding Out (1987), and Where the Money Is (2000).

Early life and education
Pitoniak was born in Westfield, Massachusetts, the daughter of Sophie (née Porubovic) and John Pitoniak. She was a graduate of the University of North Carolina at Greensboro.

Career 
Pitoniak spent two years as a civilian actress immediately after World War II, touring Japan, the Philippines and Korea for the Special Services.

In 'night, Mother she played a mother who tries to talk her grown daughter out of suicide. The play premiered at the American Repertory Theatre in Cambridge, Massachusetts, before moving to Broadway. Pitoniak and co-star Kathy Bates received Best Actress Tony Award nominations for their work. In 1994, Pitoniak received a second Tony nomination for her performance as Helen Potts in the Roundabout Theatre Company's revival of Picnic. She also appeared on Broadway in Agnes of God, The Octette Bridge Club, Amy's View, Uncle Vanya, Dance of Death, and Imaginary Friends.

Pitoniak performed regularly at the Actors Theatre of Louisville for five years, appearing in plays such as Norman's Getting Out, D.L. Coburn's The Gin Game, and Jane Martin's Middle Aged White Guys. She also worked steadily in film and television, including the 1983 comedy film The Survivors, the 1987 comedic drama films Housekeeping and Hiding Out and the 2000 comedy-drama crime film Where the Money Is. Pitoniak also had a supporting role in the 1985 film version of Agnes of God, where she played the mother of Jane Fonda's character after previously playing Mother Miriam Ruth in the Broadway version.

In 1987, Pitoniak played the role of Mary in the 1987 Cheers episode "Pudd'n Head Boyd". In 1988, she played Cornelia in The Wizard of Loneliness. In 2001, she played the role of Mrs. Berry in the Law and Order: SVU episode "Redemption".

Personal life 
Pitoniak met her future husband, Jerome Milord, then a soldier, when they were both in a United Service Organizations show in Japan. She died from cancer at her home in Manhattan at age 85.

Filmography

Film

Television

References

External links
 
 
 
 

1922 births
2007 deaths
20th-century American actresses
American film actresses
American stage actresses
American television actresses
Actresses from Massachusetts
Lee Strasberg Theatre and Film Institute alumni
People from Westfield, Massachusetts
People from Manhattan
Deaths from cancer in New York (state)
University of North Carolina at Greensboro alumni
21st-century American women